Legislative Assembly elections were held in Uttar Pradesh in 1996. The Bharatiya Janata Party remained the largest party, winning 174 of the 425 seats.

Result

Elected members

References
http://www.elections.in/uttar-pradesh/assembly-constituencies/1996-election-results.html
http://eci.nic.in/eci_main/StatisticalReports/SE_1996/StatisticalReport-UP96.pdf

1996
Uttar
1996 in Indian politics